Nico Däbritz (born 26 August 1971) is a German former footballer who is now youth scout at Dynamo Dresden.

After retiring
After retiring in 2004, Däbritz was hired as scout for Dynamo Dresden.
From April 2011 to August 2013, Däbritz was working as assistant manager for Dynamo Dresden's first team.

On 19 August 2013, Däbritz was named as youth coach of the academy in Dynamo Dresden.

References

External links
 

1971 births
Living people
German footballers
Germany under-21 international footballers
Association football midfielders
Dynamo Dresden players
Dynamo Dresden II players
1. FC Lokomotive Leipzig players
VfL Wolfsburg players
Hannover 96 players
SV Babelsberg 03 players
Bundesliga players
2. Bundesliga players
Dynamo Dresden non-playing staff
DDR-Oberliga players
People from Freital
Footballers from Saxony